Whitehouse Mountain is a  mountain summit located in Ouray County of southwest Colorado, United States. It is situated four miles west of the community of Ouray, on land managed by Uncompahgre National Forest. It is part of the Sneffels Range which is a subset of the San Juan Mountains, which in turn is part of the Rocky Mountains. It is west of the Continental Divide, 2.2 miles north of Potosi Peak, and 3.2 miles east-northeast of Mount Sneffels. The mountain's name, which has been officially adopted by the United States Board on Geographic Names, was in use before 1906 when Henry Gannett published it in the Gazetteer of Colorado.

Climate 
According to the Köppen climate classification system, Whitehouse Mountain is located in an alpine subarctic climate zone with long, cold, snowy winters, and cool to warm summers. Due to its altitude, it receives precipitation all year, as snow in winter, and as thunderstorms in summer, with a dry period in late spring. Precipitation runoff from the mountain drains into tributaries of the Uncompahgre River.

See also

References

External links 

 Weather forecast: Whitehouse Mountain

Mountains of Ouray County, Colorado
San Juan Mountains (Colorado)
Mountains of Colorado
North American 4000 m summits
Uncompahgre National Forest